Ctenidium molluscum is a species of moss belonging to the family Hypnaceae.

It is native to Eurasia and Northern America.

References

Hypnaceae